Axelle Laffont (born 24 July 1970) is a French actress and comedian.

She was born in Marseille. She is both the granddaughter of publisher Robert Laffont, and the daughter of Patrice Laffont, television presenter, and Catherine Laporte. She is also the stepdaughter of Édouard Molinaro who married her mother in 1982.

Career
Axelle Laffont participated in La Matinale d'Arthur from 1996 to 1999, but became known by intervening in La Grosse Émission from 1999 to 2000 and then presenting in 2000 and 2001 a very special weather and staggered in the show Nulle part ailleurs on Canal+, based on sketches and burlesque disguises.

She also appeared in series such as Un gars, une fille, Caméra Café, H (Season 1 Episode 12: A Red Flacon) and Kaamelott (Book 3 Episode 5: Sefriane of Aquitaine).

She makes a one-woman show La Folie du spectacle on a production by Serge Hazanavicius and Maurice Barthelemy of Robins des bois from 2002 to 2005.

In 2007, she co-wrote and co-produced Mariage surprise.

From September 2007 to January 2008, she regularly appeared in the program On n'est pas couché hosted by Laurent Ruquier on Saturday nights on France 2.

In 2009, she wrote the comic, Marny. In February 2010, she released her first album Axelle Laffont in translation, which incorporates American standards translated into French.

She also appeared on France Inter's Le Fou du roi. In 2012, she plays Smoke this cigarette at the Théâtre des Mathurins. In September 2015, she returned on stage with the one woman show HyperSensible, directed by Charles Templon.

Filmography

Films

Television

Theatre

Private life
She was in a relationship with French actor Serge Hazanavicius, until September 2009 and they have a daughter, Mitty Hazanavicius, born on 4 January 2006.

References

External links

 
 

French actresses
French humorists
French television presenters
Weather presenters
1970 births
Actresses from Marseille
Living people
Women humorists
French women television presenters